GMA Balita is a Philippine television news broadcasting show broadcast by GMA Network. Originally anchored by Mike Lacanilao, Rene Jose and Helen Vela, it premiered on May 19, 1986 replacing News at Seven. In 1995, it was moved to weekday mornings and was reformatted as a morning news show. Lacanilao, Veronica Baluyot, Lyn Ching-Pascual, Alex Tinsay and Arnold Clavio served as the final anchors. The newscast concluded on April 8, 1998. It was replaced by Mornings @ GMA in its timeslot.

Anchors
 Mike Lacanilao 
 Helen Vela 
 Rene Jose 
 Bobby Guanzon 
 Veronica Baluyut-Jimenez 
 Karen Davila 
 Amado Pineda 
 Lyn Ching-Pascual 
 Alex Tinsay 
 Arnold Clavio 
 Rey Pacheco

References

1986 Philippine television series debuts
1998 Philippine television series endings
Filipino-language television shows
GMA Network news shows
Philippine television news shows